Events from the year 1795 in art.

Events
 Nicolas-Jacques Conté patents the modern pencil 'lead' in France and produces the first Conté sticks.

Works

 William Blake's monotypes Nebuchadnezzar, Newton, The Night of Enitharmon's Joy and Pity.
 Giuseppe Ceracchi's marble portrait bust of George Washington 
 Philip James de Loutherbourg's painting Lord Howe's action, or the Glorious First of June.
 François-Xavier Fabre's Portrait of Lord Holland.
 François Gérard's portrait of fellow-artist Jean-Baptiste Isabey with his daughter.
 Francisco Goya's Self-portrait in the studio.
 Guillaume Guillon-Lethière's painting The Death of Cato of Utica
 John Hoppner's Portrait of the Frankland sisters.

Births
February 10 – Ary Scheffer, French painter of Dutch extraction (died 1858)
May 3 – Richard James Wyatt, English sculptor (died 1850)
May 7 – William Fox-Strangways, English diplomat and art collector (died 1865)
June 23 (bapt.) – William Wyon, English chief engraver at the Royal Mint (died 1851)
July 11 – Amasa Hewins, American portrait, genre, and landscape painter (died 1855)
September 12 – John Frederick Herring, Sr., English painter, sign maker and coachman (died 1865)
October 20 – William Bewick, English portrait painter (died 1866)
date unknown
William Behnes, English sculptor (died 1864)
1795-1798: Stephen Poyntz Denning, English portraitist, artist and curator (died 1864)

Deaths
January 3 – Josiah Wedgwood, English potter (born 1730)
January 13 – John Hickey, Irish-born sculptor (born 1756)
June 12 – Johann Christian Brand, Austrian painter (born 1722)
June 23 – Alexei Antropov, Russian barocco painter (born 1716)
August 4 – Francisco Bayeu y Subías, Spanish painter in the Neoclassic style, primarily of religious and historical themes  (born 1734)
August 31 – Maruyama Ōkyo, Japanese painter (born 1733)
October 6 - Johann Anton de Peters, German painter and etcher (born 1725)
November 15 – Charles-Amédée-Philippe van Loo, French portrait painter  (born 1719)
November 18 – Antonio Cavallucci, Italian painter of the late Baroque (born 1752)
December 1 – Antonio Zucchi, Italian painter of the Neoclassic period (born 1726)
December 8 – Giovanni Battista Casanova, Italian painter and printmaker (born 1730)
December 25 – John Alefounder, English portrait and miniature painter (born 1757)
date unknown
Christophe-Gabriel Allegrain, French sculptor in the neoclassical style (born 1710)
Carlo Giuseppe Ratti, Italian art biographer and painter of the late-Baroque period (born 1737)
Francesco Sozzi, Italian painter (born 1732)
Paul Theodor van Brussel, Dutch flower painter (born 1754)

References

 
Years of the 18th century in art
1790s in art